In topology, a branch of mathematics, the clutching construction is a way of constructing fiber bundles, particularly vector bundles on spheres.

Definition

Given trivialized fiber bundles with fiber  and structure group  over the two hemispheres, then given a map  (called the clutching map), glue the two trivial bundles together via f.

Formally, it is the coequalizer of the inclusions  via  and : glue the two bundles together on the boundary, with a twist.

Thus we have a map : clutching information on the equator yields a fiber bundle on the total space.

In the case of vector bundles, this yields , and indeed this map is an isomorphism (under connect sum of spheres on the right).

Generalization

Classifying map construction

Let  be a fibre bundle with fibre .

By design, the local trivializations  give a fibrewise equivalence between this quotient space and the fibre bundle .

Consider the space  modulo the equivalence relation  is equivalent to  if and only if  and consider  to be a map  then we demand that . That is, in our re-construction of  we are replacing the fibre  by the topological group of homeomorphisms of the fibre, . If the structure group of the bundle is known to reduce, you could replace  with the reduced structure group. The relation to the previous bundle is induced from the principal bundle: . 

So we have a principal bundle . Here is an outline:

Given a -principal bundle , consider the space .  This space is a fibration in two different ways:

1) Project onto the first factor: .

2) Project onto the second factor: .

Thus we have a fibration .  This map is called the classifying map of the fibre bundle  since 1) the principal bundle  is the pull-back of the bundle  along the classifying map and 2) The bundle  is induced from the principal bundle as above.

Contrast with twisted spheres

Twisted spheres are sometimes referred to as a "clutching-type" construction, but this is misleading: the clutching construction is properly about fiber bundles.

 In twisted spheres, you glue two halves along their boundary. The halves are a priori identified (with the standard ball), and points on the boundary sphere do not in general go to their corresponding points on the other boundary sphere. This is a map : the gluing is non-trivial in the base.
 In the clutching construction, you glue two bundles together over the boundary of their base hemispheres. The boundary spheres are glued together via the standard identification: each point goes to the corresponding one, but each fiber has a twist. This is a map : the gluing is trivial in the base, but not in the fibers.

Examples
The clutching construction is used to form the chiral anomaly, by gluing together a pair of self-dual curvature forms. Such forms are locally exact on each hemisphere, as they are differentials of the Chern-Simons 3-form; by gluing them together, the curvature form is no longer globally exact (and so has a non-trivial homotopy group )

Similar constructions can be found for various instantons, including the Wess–Zumino–Witten model.

See also
 Alexander trick

References
 Allen Hatcher's book-in-progress Vector Bundles & K-Theory version 2.0, p. 22.

Topology
Geometric topology
Differential topology
Differential structures